Mission Township is located in LaSalle County, Illinois. As of the 2010 census, its population was 3,972 and it contained 1,083 housing units.

History
Mission Township was given its name due to the church-riding ministers riding across to different churches in the township.  One of these ministers, Jessie Walker, actually has a memorial at the United Methodist Church in Sheridan, which is the seat of the township.

Geography
The township is shares its western boundary with Serena Township, and its northern boundary with Northville Township.  The township border is defined by where the Fox River goes southwest, turns south, then continues to go east, south, west, northwest, north, and then it then curves to go southwest again, forming an awkward "S" shape on the map.

The community of Sheridan resides at the beginning of the bends in the river, and the community of Norway resides where the river flows north, and then curves around to flow southwest.  Millington resides along the river, northeast of Sheridan. The community of Newark resides along the county line within Kendall County, but the community is no more than 4 to 5 miles away from the river.

Notable Locations
Fox River Resort (Norway), site of timeshare lodging facility, owned by RCI, a division of Wyndham Worldwide.
Norwegian Memorial (Norway), site of plaques from the Norwegian King commemorating the community's founding in 1834.
Agricultural Crash Memorial (Norway), site of a crashed plane, which symbolized the sudden and abrupt economic decline in agricultural prices during the 1980s.
Jessie Walker Memorial (Sheridan), commemorates the court-riding ministers who gave the township its name, the most notable of whom was Jessie Walker.  The memorial is along the side of the Sheridan United Methodist Church in town.
Sheridan Correctional Facility (Sheridan), facility run by the Illinois Department of Corrections for rehabilitation, and is currently rated as a medium-security facility.
Robert Rowe Public Library (Sheridan), library named for local philanthropist and descendant of one of the community's founding families, houses historical records about the area.
Norsk Museum (Norway), shows how life was like for the Norwegian settlers in the early years of the community.
Norway Store (Norway), a family-run store whose distinctive and curious architecture reflects the structures that were in the original community.
Concept Haulers Speedway (Norway), a go-kart track which is known for having frequent races and tournaments featuring local racers.
The Old Mill Inn (Sheridan), a former local bar, turned restaurant which is known for its Fried Chicken, Taco Nite, and other local draws.
The Corner Tap (Sheridan), a local tavern whose claim to be "The Center of The World" is not lost on the locals, and every August, it hosts a Lawn Mower Poker Run and Tractor Pull Competition, which is a big draw.
Sheridan Veterans Memorial (Sheridan), now complete, and it honors the branches of the military, the town's contributions to every armed conflict, and all who have served.

Demographics

County Highways
CH 3 (South of Sheridan) 2603rd Road/Sheridan-Norway Road/Gerald "Jerry" Johnson Highway
CH 3 (In Sheridan) Robinson Street
CH 3 (North of Sheridan) 2603rd Road, 4251st Road, 2750th Road/Sheridan Blacktop
CH 32 N 41st Road/Si Johnson Avenue/Bowen Road
CH 31 E 30th Road/Millington Road

References

External links
City-data.com
Illinois State Archives

Townships in LaSalle County, Illinois
Populated places established in 1849
Townships in Illinois
1849 establishments in Illinois